J. Benjamin 'Ben' Connell (born February 20, 1982) is an American politician of the Republican Party. He is a member of the South Carolina House of Representatives representing District 52. In the 2022 primary election for South Carolina House of Representatives District 52, Connell defeated Republican incumbent Vic Dabney, who had been a member of the South Carolina House since 2020. Connell went on to defeat Democratic nominee Eve Carlin in the general election.

Prior to this election, Connell served on Kershaw County Council.

Connell serves on the House Judiciary Committee.

Camden was born in Camden, South Carolina and resides in Lugoff, South Carolina.

References

Living people
1982 births
21st-century American politicians
Republican Party members of the South Carolina House of Representatives
People from Camden, South Carolina
People from Lugoff, South Carolina
2022 South Carolina elections